Sakhya Re is a Marathi serial produced by Sanjyot Vaidya, Omkar Vaidya, Chinmay Mandlekar under Blue Whale Media banner. The serial is directed by Raju Sawant. It was released on 9 January 2017 and stopped on 3 June 2017 on Colors Marathi.

Synopsis 
They say Husband and Wife are two wheels of a cart, but what if a wheel between these two willingly asks the other to get rid of the cart and go help somebody else?

Cast 
 Rohini Hattangadi as Maasaheb
 Suyash Tilak as Sameer and Ranvijay
 Ruchi Savarn as Priyamvada
 Dnyanada Ramtirthkar as Vaidehi
 Ajay Purkar as Arvind Mirajkar
 Ashwini Kulkarni as Manasi Mirajkar
 Abhishek Bhalerao as Javkar

Production

Casting
Rohini Hattangadi is coming back on Marathi TV with Sakhya Re. She plays the character of Masasaheb. Actor Suyash Tilak who was last seen Ka Re Durava is also in lead role in 'Sakhya Re'. Ruchi Savarn is also in key role in Sakhya Re. Dnyanada Ramtirthkar is making her debut with this show.

Airing history 
It released on 9 January 2017 on Colors Marathi and aired from Monday to Saturday at 9 pm.

References

External links 
 
 Sakhya Re at Voot

Marathi-language television shows
Colors Marathi original programming
2017 Indian television series debuts
2017 Indian television series endings